Jyot Jale is a 1973 Bollywood drama film directed by Satyen Bose and starring Nirupa Roy.

External links
 

1973 films
1970s Hindi-language films
1973 drama films